Saltillo is an unincorporated community in Hopkins County, Texas, in the United States. It is located sixteen miles east of Sulphur Springs at the intersection of US 67 and FM 900. Saltillo has a population of approximately 300. Despite being unincorporated, Saltillo has its own post office, assigned the ZIP code of 75478. The Saltillo Independent School District serves area students.

History

On January 13, 1985, Saltillo was the location of a car chase and shootout between FBI agents, Texas Rangers, and a group of kidnappers. Two of the six kidnappers were wounded in the gunfight, and their hostage, a thirteen-year-old girl, was rescued unharmed. The case was later featured in an episode of The FBI Files.

The church of Christ, at the intersection of US Highway 67 and Farm to Market Road 900, has served the community for many years.

References

External links
Satillo History

Unincorporated communities in Hopkins County, Texas
Unincorporated communities in Texas